Blacktown International Sportspark Oval is an Australian rules football and cricket ground located in Rooty Hill, a suburb in Sydney, Australia. The stadium was constructed in 2009 as part of the Blacktown International Sportspark. It has a capacity of 10,000 people.

Australian rules football
The venue served as the main training facility for the Australian Football League's Greater Western Sydney Giants from the club's inception in 2010 (including through its AFL senior debut in 2012) until 2014, when the club moved its base to Sydney Olympic Park. It played its TAC Cup and NEAFL games at the venue in 2010 and 2011 respectively. It was also the primary venue for international matches for the 2011 Australian Football International Cup.

It has never been the club's primary Sydney venue for AFL home games – Sydney Showground Stadium has always served that role – but Blacktown did host one senior premiership match against  in Round 3, 2012, prior to the completion of the Showgrounds redevelopment. The stadium has been the primary home ground for the  women's team since the team's inception in 2017, and it has also been used for AFL pre-season matches featuring both Greater Western Sydney and the Sydney Swans.

Since 2015 BISP has been the home ground of the Blacktown City Suns Junior AFL Club

References

External links

Official site

Defunct Australian Football League grounds
Cricket grounds in New South Wales
Multi-purpose stadiums in Australia
Sports venues in Sydney
North East Australian Football League grounds
AFL Women's grounds
Victorian Football League grounds